Manturam Pakhira is an All India Trinamool Congress politician and a Minister of State (Independent Charge) of Sundarbans Affairs in the Council of Ministers of West Bengal. He is son of Kalipada Pakhira, he is a social worker. On 30 September 2020, he has been diagnosed with COVID-19 and thereafter hospitalized in Beleghata Infectious Disease Hospital in Kolkata.

Politics 
Pakhira was first elected from Kakdwip (Vidhan Sabha constituency) in South 24 Parganas in 2001, and again elected in 2011. He was inducted as a Minister of State in charge of Sunderbans Development in November 2012.

References

Trinamool Congress politicians from West Bengal
Living people
Members of the West Bengal Legislative Assembly
People from South 24 Parganas district
1963 births